Oasen Storsenter is a shopping centre in Norheim in Karmøy, Norway. In 2014 it had a turnover of 688 million Norwegian kroner. It has 65 stores in 33,000 m² of building space (18,500 m² of commercial space). In addition to this there are 28 services within health and well-being.

History
After Karmøy was founded as a result of merging several municipalities in 1965, a fairly large part of the new municipality was located on the mainland, and within a few years became the quickest growing part of Karmøy. Unlike the various villages on the island proper, the mainland lacked a centralized area for shops and businesses. Oasen Storsenter opened as the first one in the region in 1977. During the first year the shopping centre only had 6000 m² available, but this was expanded to 10,000 m² in 1978, with further expansions in 1985, 1996, 2002 and 2014.

Oasen Storsenter was bought by Olav Thon in 1998 for 160 million kroner.

Today
Today the shopping centre spans three floors, with shops in the basement and first floor and a gym and various health services on the second floor.

References

External links
 Official website

Buildings and structures in Rogaland
Shopping centres in Norway